Thomas Fisher (1792-1874) is a road builder, land developer, Squire, and Etobicoke Township pioneer. He immigrated from Yorkshire settled along the Humber River in 1822 and became a successful merchant-miller. His mill located at King's Mill was acquired in 1821.

Fisher is the namesake of Thomas Fisher Rare Books Library. The Department of Rare Books and Special Collections and the University Archives didn't have a permanent home until 1973 when the Thomas Fisher Rare Book library was opened. Great-grandsons, Sidney and Charles Fisher, donated to the library their own collections of Shakespeare, various twentieth-century authors, and etchings of Wenceslaus Hollar.

Fisher was an inductee into the Etobicoke Hall of Fame, 1974.

Canadian merchants

People from Etobicoke
1792 births
1874 deaths